The 2008 Ohio Bobcats football team represented Ohio University during the 2008 NCAA Division I FBS football season. Ohio competed as a member of the East Division of the Mid-American Conference (MAC). The Bobcats were led by Frank Solich in his fourth year.  They played their home games in Peden Stadium in Athens, Ohio.

Schedule

References

Ohio
Ohio Bobcats football seasons
Ohio Bobcats football